(also written 2006 QV89) is an Apollo near-Earth asteroid roughly  in diameter.

Recovery 
The August 2019 orbit solution will pass about  further from Earth than the 2006 orbit solution. It was removed from the Sentry Risk Table on 11 August 2019.

Possible Earth impact
 has a low 1.07° orbital inclination with respect to the Ecliptic plane and an Earth-MOID of only 10200 km. Where Earth will be on a given date was known, but given the relatively old and short observation arc (10 days in 2006) it could not be predicted accurately where the asteroid will be on its orbit. Based on the available data, the Sentry Risk Table showed an estimated 1 in 9100 chance of the asteroid impacting Earth on 9 September 2019. The European Space Agency listed the odds of impact at a comparable 1 in 7300 on 9 September 2019.

A Monte Carlo simulation using Solex 12 with 1000 clones of the asteroid showed that the asteroid's possible positions overlap Earth. The line of variation (LOV) passed over Antarctica and the southern tip of Argentina.

Impact ruled out
While the position of the asteroid was too uncertain as of July 2019 to recover it, it was known where it would be if it were on a collision course. Based on non-observations from 4 to 5 July 2019, the impact was ruled out on 16 July 2019, using the Very Large Telescope in Chile. The detection (or lack thereof) of asteroids by this method may be useful for ruling out other potential collisions.

The asteroid came to opposition (opposite the Sun in the sky) on 28 July 2019 at an apparent magnitude of ~22.

Notes

See also

References

External links 
SETI Talk with Franck Marchis and Michael Busch
 
 
 

Minor planet object articles (unnumbered)
Discoveries by the Catalina Sky Survey

20060829
20190927